Gata or GATA may refer to:

Geography
Gtaʼ language (alternate spelling Gata)
Gata, Cape Verde, a village the island of Boa Vista, Cape Verde
Gata, Croatia, a village in Dalmatia, Croatia
Cape Gata, a cape on Cyprus
Gata de Gorgos, a municipality in the province of Alicante, Valencian Community, Spain
Sierra de Gata, a mountainous region of Spain
Sierra de Gata (comarca), in Cáceres Province, Extremadura, Spain
Gata, Extremadura, a municipality in the comarca
Gatas (Ponce), a Puerto Rican island off the southern coast of Puerto Rico in the municipality of Ponce

People
Gata, a diminutive of the Russian female name Agata (a variant of "Agatha")
Gata Kamsky (born 1974), Tatar-American chess player
Soakimi Gatafahefa (1838–1896), also known as Gata, the first Roman Catholic priest from Polynesia
GaTa (Davionte Ganter), American rapper & actor

Film and TV
La Gata (1947 film), a 1947 Argentine drama film
La Gata (1968 telenovela), a Venezuelan telenovela
La Gata (1970 TV series), produced by Teleprogramas Acapulco (Televisa), starring Juan Ferrara
La Gata (2014 telenovela), produced by Televisa

Other uses
Gata (food), an Armenian pastry
GATA transcription factor
Gata (weapon), or Gata waka, a gunstock war club of Fiji 
"Gata", a song of 6ix9ine and Lil AK
Gülhane Military Medical Academy (GATA), former name of a hospital located in Turkey

See also
Gold Anti-Trust Action Committee (GATAC)
Gatas (disambiguation)
Gaeta (disambiguation)

de:Perreo#Wortherkunft